Desmond Hector (born 14 November 1968) is a Guyanese middle-distance runner. He competed in the men's 800 metres at the 1992 Summer Olympics.

References

External links
 

1968 births
Living people
Athletes (track and field) at the 1992 Summer Olympics
Guyanese male middle-distance runners
Olympic athletes of Guyana
Commonwealth Games competitors for Guyana
Athletes (track and field) at the 1991 Pan American Games
Athletes (track and field) at the 1994 Commonwealth Games
Central American and Caribbean Games silver medalists for Guyana
Competitors at the 1993 Central American and Caribbean Games
Place of birth missing (living people)
Central American and Caribbean Games medalists in athletics
Pan American Games competitors for Guyana